Wągrodno may refer to the following places in Poland:
Wągrodno, Lower Silesian Voivodeship (south-west Poland)
Wągrodno, Nowy Dwór Mazowiecki County in Masovian Voivodeship (east-central Poland)
Wągrodno, Piaseczno County in Masovian Voivodeship (east-central Poland)
Wągrodno, West Pomeranian Voivodeship (north-west Poland)